The Old Custom House of Bangor is a 17th-century tower and adjoining tower house. It is situated on the seafront in Bangor, County Down, Northern Ireland. It is a well-preserved reminder of Bangor's seafaring history alongside its modern marina.

Originally built as a custom house by The 1st Viscount Claneboye in 1637, the architecture of the tower is unique in Bangor and rare in Ulster. Over the past 300 years the building has served various purposes – private dwellings, an antique shop and housed hot seawater baths.

The future of the Tower House was protected when the Historic Buildings Branch of the Department of the Environment (D.o.E.) added it to their "List of Buildings of Special Interest" in 1979. Today, Tower House serves as the Council's Tourist Information Centre.

It is located at by the Coast Guard building very near the bottom of High Street, Bangor, Co.Down.

Buildings and structures completed in 1637
Buildings and structures in County Down
Bangor, County Down
Custom houses in the United Kingdom
Grade A listed buildings
1637 establishments in the British Empire